The Midnight Club is an American horror mystery-thriller streaming television series created by Mike Flanagan and Leah Fong, with Flanagan serving as showrunner, lead writer and executive producer. The series is set in a hospice and follows eight terminally ill young adults who form "the Midnight Club", meeting up each night to tell each other scary tales; it features an overarching story while also frequently depicting those tales on-screen. Although mostly based on the 1994 novel The Midnight Club by Christopher Pike, the series also adapts short stories from "27" other Pike books, featured in the "Midnight Club" tales themselves.

The series stars Iman Benson, Adia, Igby Rigney, Ruth Codd, Aya Furukawa, Annarah Shephard, William Chris Sumpter, and Sauriyan Sapkota as the eight Midnight Club members, alongside Heather Langenkamp, Zach Gilford, Matt Biedel, and Samantha Sloyan as older adults working at or living near the hospice; in addition to their main characters, cast members also portray the ones featured in the "Midnight Club" tales.

The Midnight Club premiered on Netflix on October 7, 2022. Unlike all three of Flanagan's previous series, it is not a miniseries, and was intended as a limited-run series meant to run for two seasons. However, in December 2022, the series was canceled after one season.

Overview
A group of eight close terminally ill young adults resides in the Brightcliffe Home hospice outside of Seattle run by an enigmatic doctor. They meet at midnight every night to tell each other scary stories. They have a pact that the first one to succumb to their disease is responsible for communicating with the others from beyond the grave.

Cast

Main
 Iman Benson as Ilonka, a teenager with thyroid cancer who enrolls at Brightcliffe Hospice in the hopes of finding an unconventional cure
 Igby Rigney as Kevin, a member of the Midnight Club who has terminal leukemia
 Ruth Codd as Anya, Ilonka's roommate with an Irish accent and member of the Midnight Club. She has a right lower leg amputation as a result of bone cancer and uses a wheelchair for mobility.
 Annarah Cymone as Sandra, a member of the Midnight Club who has terminal lymphoma and is a devoted Christian
 Chris Sumpter as Spencer, a member of the Midnight Club who has AIDS
 Adia as Cheri, a member of the Midnight Club who has wealthy parents and is a pathological liar
 Aya Furukawa as Natsuki, a member of the Midnight Club who has depression and terminal ovarian cancer
 Sauriyan Sapkota as Amesh, a member of the Midnight Club who has glioblastoma and is the second newest arrival at Brightcliffe
 Matt Biedel as Tim, Ilonka's foster father
 Samantha Sloyan as Shasta, a woman who lives in a commune close to Brightcliffe Hospice
 Zach Gilford as Mark, a Nurse Practitioner at Brightcliffe Hospice
 Heather Langenkamp as Dr. Georgina Stanton, the enigmatic doctor who runs Brightcliffe Hospice

Recurring
 Emilija Baranac as Katherine, Kevin's girlfriend
 Daniel Diemer as Rhett, Anya's former friend
 Katie Parker as Aceso, founder of Paragon
 Larsen Thompson as Julia Jayne, a former patient at Brightcliffe Hospice
 Robert Longstreet as Janitor at Brightcliffe Hospice
 William B. Davis as Mirror Man, a ghostly figure in Ilonka's visions
 Patricia Drake as a ghostly figure in Ilonka's visions
 Crystal Balint as Maggie, Ilonka's late foster mother
 Jenaya Ross as Tristan, bed-ridden Brightcliffe Hospice resident
 Henry Thomas as Freedom Jack, a character in Natsuki's Midnight Club story
 Alex Essoe as Poppy Corn, a character in Natsuki's Midnight Club story
 Rahul Kohli as Vincent, a character in Amesh's Midnight Club story
 Michael Trucco as Frederick, a character in Amesh's Midnight Club story

Episodes

Production

Development
In May 2020, it was announced an adaptation of Christopher Pike's young adult novel The Midnight Club would be created for Netflix by Mike Flanagan and Leah Fong. In an interview for IGN, Flanagan revealed that he was profoundly inspired by Nickelodeon’s horror anthology series Are You Afraid of the Dark?. On the series' release in October 2022, Flanagan confirmed that the series would also adapt all "28 books" of Pike's, having pitched the series as "The Midnight Club — but the stories the kids tell [each other] will be other Christopher Pike books", planning for multiple seasons. On December 1, 2022, Netflix canceled the series after one season. Following its cancellation, Flanagan revealed what was planned for later seasons on his Tumblr, including the ultimate fates of the various characters and answers to the show's lingering mysteries.

Casting
Flanagan confirmed the cast in a series of tweets on Twitter: Adia, Igby Rigney, Ruth Codd, Aya Furukawa, Annarah Shephard, William Chris Sumpter, Sauriyan Sapkota as the titular cast, and Heather Langenkamp as the doctor presiding over the hospice of the terminally ill. Zach Gilford and Matt Biedel, and recurring Flanagan collaborators Samantha Sloyan and Robert Longstreet appear in recurring roles. In April 2021, Iman Benson, Larsen Thompson, William B. Davis, Crystal Balint, and Patricia Drak joined the cast.

Filming
The project began production on March 15, 2021, in Burnaby, British Columbia, and was planned to conclude on September 8, 2021, but actually finished production on September 10. The first two episodes of the series are directed by Flanagan, and other episodes in the season were helmed by directors Axelle Carolyn, Emmanuel Osei-Kuffour, Michael Fimognari, Morgan Beggs, and Viet Nguyen.

Release
The Midnight Club was released on Netflix on October 7, 2022.

Reception
The review aggregator website Rotten Tomatoes reported an 87% approval rating with an average rating of 7.4/10, based on 54 critic reviews. The website's critics' consensus reads, "Mike Flanagan's hot streak of heartfelt horror stories continues strong in The Midnight Club, a tale of terminal teenagers told with jolts and joie de vivre." Metacritic, which uses a weighted average, assigned a score of 64 out of 100 based on 21 critics, indicating "generally favorable reviews".

The first episode of the series broke the Guinness World Record for the most scripted jump-scares in a single episode of television at 21 jump-scares.

Between October 2 and October 23, 2022, The Midnight Club recorded 90.31 million hours viewed in the Netflix top 10s.

References

External links
 
 
 The Midnight Club at Rotten Tomatoes

2020s American drama television series
2020s American LGBT-related drama television series
2020s American horror television series
2020s American mystery television series
2020s American supernatural television series
2022 American television series debuts
2022 American television series endings
American horror fiction television series
American thriller television series
Ghosts in television
English-language Netflix original programming
Horror drama television series
Television series about cancer
Television series about cults
Television series about teenagers
Television series about witchcraft
Television shows based on American novels
Television shows filmed in Burnaby